Rudgea crassifolia is a species of plant in the family Rubiaceae. It is endemic to Brazil.  Its natural habitat is subtropical or tropical dry shrubland. It is threatened by habitat loss.

References

crassifolia
Endemic flora of Brazil
Flora of the Atlantic Forest
Vulnerable flora of South America
Taxonomy articles created by Polbot